Pholidocarpus kingianus is a species of flowering plant in the family Arecaceae. It is found in Peninsular Malaysia and Singapore. It is threatened by habitat destruction.

References

kingianus
Trees of Malaya
Vulnerable plants
Taxa named by Odoardo Beccari
Taxonomy articles created by Polbot